Dr. Ferenc Ódor (born 22 November 1954) is a Hungarian veterinary physician and politician, member of the National Assembly (MP) for Encs (Borsod-Abaúj-Zemplén County Constituency IX) from 1998 to 2014. He served as mayor of Garadna between 1990 and 1998. He also functioned as president of the General Assembly of Borsod-Abaúj-Zemplén County twice: from 1998 to 2002 and between 2006 and 2010.

In the general election held in 2006, he was elected MP for Encs for the third time. He was a member of the Local Government and Urban Development Committee between 30 May 2006 and 13 May 2010. He was re-elected individual MP during the 2010 parliamentary election. He functioned as member of the Committee on Agriculture and Committee on Health Affairs until 31 December 2012.

Ódor was appointed head of the District Office of Encs on 17 December 2012. Following the adoption of new law on conflicts of interest, he did not run for a parliamentary seat in the 2014 parliamentary election, retaining his office of district head. Ódor was arrested on charges of accepting official bribes on 19 December 2018. He was suspended from his post with immediate effect.

Personal life
He is married. His wife is Dr Katalin Zelenák. They have two daughters, Katalin and Cseperke.

References

1954 births
Living people
Hungarian veterinarians
Mayors of places in Hungary
Fidesz politicians
Members of the National Assembly of Hungary (1998–2002)
Members of the National Assembly of Hungary (2002–2006)
Members of the National Assembly of Hungary (2006–2010)
Members of the National Assembly of Hungary (2010–2014)
People from Kecskemét